The following lists events that happened during 1944 in Cape Verde.

Incumbents
Colonial governor: João de Figueiredo

Events
March - Cape Verdean review Certeza started publishing in Praia

Births
22 February: Isaura Gomes, politician and pharmacist
17 May: Luís de Matos Monteiro da Fonseca, politician

References

 
1944 in the Portuguese Empire
Years of the 20th century in Cape Verde
1940s in Cape Verde
Cape Verde
Cape Verde